The terms "DOD-STD-2167" and "DOD-STD-2168" (often mistakenly referred to as "MIL-STD-2167" and "MIL-STD-2168" respectively) are the official specification numbers for superseded U.S. DoD military standards describing documents and procedures required for developing military computer systems.  Specifically:

 DOD-STD-2167 described the necessary project documentation to be delivered when developing a "Mission-Critical" computer software system. 
 DOD-STD-2168 was the DoD's software quality assurance standard, titled "Defense System Software Quality Program".

On December 5, 1994, the standards DOD-STD-2167A and DOD-STD-2168 were superseded by MIL-STD-498, which merged DOD-STD-2167A, DOD-STD-7935A, and DOD-STD-2168 into a single document while also incorporating changes to address vendor criticisms.

See also
 MIL-STD-498 - standard which superseded DOD-STD-2167A and DOD-STD-2168
 DOD-STD-2167A - the succeeding revision
 Capability Maturity Model (CMM)

Notes

References

 
 
 
 
 "Frameworks for quality software process: SEI Capability Maturity Model...", Springerlink.com, 2007, webpage PDF: SL6-PDF: states, "MIL-STD-2167 is the standard many DoD contractors have had to deliver...whereas MIL-STD-2168 is the DoD's quality assurance standard."

Military of the United States standards
Software engineering publications